Dölpopa Shérap Gyeltsen (1292–1361), known simply as Dölpopa, was a Tibetan Buddhist master. Known as "The Buddha from Dölpo," a region in modern Nepal, he was the principal exponent of the shentong teachings, and an influential member of the Jonang tradition of Tibetan Buddhism.

Biography
Dölpopa was born in Dölpo. In 1309, when he was seventeen, he ran away from home to seek the Buddhist teachings, first in Mustang and then in Tibet. In 1314, when he was twenty-two years old, Dölpopa received full monastic ordination from the famous abbot of Choelung Monastery, Sönam Trakpa (1273–1352), and made a vow at the time to never eat slaughtered meat again.

In 1321, Dölpopa visited Jonang Monastery at Jomonang (which was later destroyed during the Cultural Revolution) for the first time. He then visited Tsurphu Monastery for the first time and had extensive discussions with Rangjung Dorje, 3rd Karmapa Lama, about doctrinal issues. It appears that the Karmapa Lama almost certainly influenced the development of some of Dölpopa's theories, possibly including shentong. Other than this, Dölpopa had studied almost completely under the Sakya tradition until he was thirty years old in 1322 and he had taught for most of the previous decade at the great Sakya Monastery.

In 1327, after the death of his guru Yönden Gyantso, Dölpopa decided to fulfill a prayer he had made at the great stupa at Trophu (Khro phu) to repay his master's kindness. "He also felt that the stūpa would become an object of worship for people who were not fortunate enough to engage in study, contemplation, and meditation, and therefore provide them with the opportunity to accumulate virtue."

In time, Dölpopa became one of the most influential and original yet controversial of Tibetan Buddhist teachers, systemizing Buddha-nature and Yogacara-Madhyamaka teachings in teaching known as shentong.

Dölpopa retired from the leadership of Jonang Monastery in 1338 and appointed the translator lotsawa Lödro Bal to succeed him. Lödro Bal remained in this role for seventeen years.

Teachings
According to Stearns,

According to John Newman, "[T]he Kālacakra tantra presupposes a developmental model [of buddhahood], in opposition to the revelatory model interpretation of the Kālacakra promoted by Dol po pa Shes rab rgyal mtshan."

In line with the Buddha-nature teachings and the prevalent Yogacara-Madhyamaka synthesis, Dölpopa interpreted śūnyatā as twofold, distinguishing the conventional "emptiness of self-nature" (rangtong), and the ultimate "emptiness of other" (shentong), which is the clear nature of mind. Dölpopa taught that emptiness of self-nature applied only to relative truth, while emptiness of other is characteristic of ultimate truth, i.e. ultimate Reality is not empty of its own uncreated and deathless Truth, but only of what is impermanent and illusory.

Dölpopa employed the term 'Self' or 'Soul' (atman) to refer to the ultimate truth, that, according to him, lay at the heart of all being. In his Mountain Doctrine work, he refers to this essence as the "Great Self", "True Self", "Diamond Self", "Supreme Self", "Solid Self" and "Supreme Self of all Creatures", basing himself on specific utterances and doctrines of the Buddha in the Mahāyāna Mahāparinirvāṇa Sūtra, the Aṅgulimālīya Sūtra and the Śrīmālādevī Siṃhanāda Sūtra, amongst others While most of his peers balk at such a term, there are still exponents of the Nyingma and Kagyu schools who are happy to see the heart of all beings as one unified, egoless Buddha-self. Shenpen Hookham, for example, writes affirmatively of the True Self in the teachings of Dölpopa and other great Buddhist masters, saying:

Hookham further points out that Dölpopa really envisioned the Buddha within each being as an actual, living truth and presence, not conditioned or generated by any temporal process of causation:

Dölpopa uses many scriptural citations to support his view, drawing upon sutras and tantras to substantiate his understanding of Mahayana and tantric teachings on definitive truth. As Cyrus Stearns writes in his monograph on Dölpopa, this scholar-monk made:

Dölpopa also frequently makes use of such positive terms which he finds in the selfsame scriptures and tantras as 'permanent', 'everlasting, 'eternal' and 'Self' (Stearns, ibid.). This, Dölpopa claims, all pertains to the realm of Nirvana and is one with the Buddha-nature. It is not merely an intellectual view, but a direct experience of great bliss and this doctrine is (according to Dölpopa) communicated to Buddhists via the mediacy of the Mahayana Buddha-nature sutras:

This felicitous state is said to lie within the being, eternally. But within the samsaric mode of perceiving, it is not recognized, and darkness remains. Stearns brings out the distinction which Dölpopa draws here between samsara and nirvana, quoting Kalkin Pundarika to make the point:

For Dölpopa, the indwelling Buddha (or Nirvana) is genuinely real, yet 'empty' in one sense - in that the internal Buddha or Buddha nature is empty of illusion, but replete with wondrous Buddha qualities. For Dölpopa and those who espouse analogous shentong doctrines:

Dölpopa further comments that worldlings believe that they have Self, happiness, permanence, and purity, but that they look in the wrong direction for these transcendental qualities, whereas those who have transcended the world use these terms meaningfully since they know where these qualities are to be found. Even having faith in the reality of these higher qualities helps remove spiritual veils:

Cyrus Stearns points out that for Dölpopa, spiritual awareness or jñāna is a key constituent of the Buddhist path and allows the practitioner to burn away veils of ignorance and thus to see the eternal qualities of the Buddha's body of reality (the Dharmakaya):

Dölpopa even wrote a prayer wishing that the Buddhas might take pity on those Buddhists who deem that the Emptiness taught by the Buddha is nothing more than a non-affirming negation and concerns only self-emptiness (the absence of essence in all things). Dölpopa writes on this point:

Dölpopa also wrote a commentary on the Ratnagotravibhāga.

Influence
Dölpopa found a strong supporter and advocate in the later Jonangpa lama, Taranatha, who was keen to spread Dölpopa's ideas. Cyrus Stearns comments on this:

Suppression
The entire corpus of Dölpopa's writings was completely suppressed by the dominant Gelug school for several hundred years, for both doctrinal and political reasons. The doctrinal reason was his approach to the Buddhist concept of śūnyatā (Wylie: stong pa nyid), distinguishing "emptiness of self-nature" (Wylie: rang stong, pronounced /rangtong/) from "emptiness of other" (Wylie: gzhan stong, pronounced /shentong/).

Guy Newland conveys the political intrigue of the 5th Dalai Lama against the Jonangpa, the king of gTsang, and the writings and philosophy of Dölpopa:

Written works
Ocean of Definitive Meaning
Great Calculation of the Doctrine that have the Significance of a Fourth Council (with auto commentary) 
Prayer for Birth in Sukhāvatī (bDe ba can du skye ba ’dzin pa’i smon lam) 
An Official Document of the King, the Spontaneously Present Dharmakāya 
A General Commentary on all Profound Sutra and Tantra Teachings: Entitled, "Knowing One, All is Liberated" 
Buddha Nature’s Auspiciousness 
The Great Praise of Shambhala 
Seizing the Crucial Point 
An Instruction to Lhaje Tsultrim O 
In Praise of the Eight Siddhas 
Praise to the Mahasiddha Shavaripa 
 Mountain Doctrine, Ocean of Definitive Meaning: Final Unique Quintessential Instructions. Translation: Jeffrey Hopkins (2017), Mountain Doctrine: Tibet's Fundamental Treatise on Other-Emptiness and the Buddha Matrix, Shambhala
Dolpopa's complete works in 13 volumes, Pe Cin edition
Dolpopa's complete works in 8 volumes, 'Dzam Thang edition
Dolpopa's complete works in 1 volumes, Gyantse edition

Notes

References

 See also 
Ātman (Buddhism)
God in Buddhism

 Sources 

 
 
 Gruschke, A. (2000). The Jonangpa Order - Causes for the downfall, conditions of the survival and current situation of a presumably extinct Tibetan-Buddhist School.'' Ninth Seminar of The International Association for Tibetan Studies
 
 
 
 .

External links
Dolpopa Introduction & Jonang Dharma Association
Dolpopa on www.JonangFoundation.org
Tibetan Buddhist Rime Institute - Holder of Kalachakra Jonang
History of the Jonang Tradition - International Kalachakra Network
  Abstract for Gruschke, A. (2000). The Jonangpa Order - Causes for the downfall, conditions of the survival and current situation of a presumably extinct Tibetan-Buddhist School. Ninth Seminar of The International Association for Tibetan Studies
 Tibetan Buddhist Resource Center Biographical Data

Jonang lamas
Nepalese scholars of Buddhism
Nepalese philosophers
Tibetan Buddhists from Nepal
Nepalese Buddhists
1292 births
1361 deaths
People from Dolpa District
Shentong